Macrocheilus dorsalis is a species of ground beetle in the subfamily Anthiinae. It was described by Johann Christoph Friedrich Klug in 1834.

References

Anthiinae (beetle)
Beetles described in 1834